Mycobacterium szulgai is a species of Mycobacterium. It is a scotochromogen and is currently ungrouped. It is known to cause skin infections.

References

External links
Type strain of Mycobacterium szulgai at BacDive -  the Bacterial Diversity Metadatabase

szulgai